Penacook Lake is a  lake located in Merrimack County in central New Hampshire, United States, in the city of Concord. It has also been known as "Long Pond". It is the largest lake in Concord and serves as the city's water supply. Water that is not captured by the city's water treatment plant flows two-thirds of a mile to the Merrimack River.

See also

List of lakes in New Hampshire

References

Concord, New Hampshire
Lakes of Merrimack County, New Hampshire
New Hampshire placenames of Native American origin